WPJN is a radio station airing a Christian Contemporary Music format, licensed to Jemison, Alabama, broadcasting on 89.3 MHz FM. The station is owned by C W Johnson Education Foundation Inc.

References

External links
WPJN's official website

Contemporary Christian radio stations in the United States
PJN